Zodarion alacre is a spider species found in Portugal and Spain.

See also
 List of Zodariidae species

References

External links

alacre
Spiders of Europe
Spiders described in 1870